Martha Cecilia (born Maribeth dela Cruz y Hamoy) was a Filipino writer of Tagalog romance pocketbook novels. She was the author of best selling novel series Kristine and Sweetheart. Many of her novels were serialized by ABS-CBN under Precious Hearts Romances Presents.

Personal life
Maribeth dela Cruz or popularly known as Martha Cecilia was born on May 13, 1953 in the city of Dapitan in Zamboanga del Norte, Philippines.

She was a commerce graduate from the University of the East, Manila and said to have finished in Conchitina Bernardo’s Karilagan Finishing School in Sta. Mesa.

Martha Cecilia had 4 children, Jose Paolo (also a writer under the penname JP Adrian), Marta Cecilia (her daughter where she got her pen name and also a writer under the penname Tsina Cajayon), Nina Martinne and Juan Miguel.

Martha Cecilia succumbed to cancer on December 8, 2014.

Career
Martha Cecilia's writing career was inspired after her meeting with Tagalog novelist Olga Medina. Her first work 'Akin Ka Noon, Ngayon at Magpakailanman' was published in 1997 by Precious Pages Corp. under its subsidiary Precious Hearts Romances.

She had written more than a hundred novels under different titles for Precious Hearts Romance like 'GEMS', 'My Love, My Hero', 'My Lovely Bride', 'PHR Classics', 'All Time Favorites', 'Sweetheart' and her much acclaimed series 'Kristine'.

Television
Martha Cecilia had written novels which were later adapted to TV series which includes the gold medal awardee Impostor for Best Telenovela Category in International Emmy Awards.

Bibliography

Kristine Series
 The Devil's Kiss
 Ang Sisiw at Ang Agila
 Dahil Ikaw
 Jewel, Black Diamond
 Villa Kristine
 Amoré (Beloved Stranger)
 Franco Navarro
 Wild Rose
 Magic Moment
 Wild Heart 1 & 2
 Endlessly 1, 2 & 3
 Rose Tattoo 1 & 2
 Romano
 Kapeng Barako at Krema 1 & 2
 Romano 2
 Hasta La Proxima Vez 1, 2 & 3
 Panther Walks 1 & 2
 One Wish 1 & 2
 James Navarro 1 & 2
 My Wild Heiress 1 & 2
 The Blue-Eyed Devil 1 & 2
 Wild Passion 1 & 2
 Wild Enchantment 1 & 2
 Ivan Henrick
 Have You Looked Into My Heart 1 & 2
 Trace Lavigne 1 & 2
 The Warrior: Brad Sta. de Leones 1, 2 & 3
 Alessandro Leon 1, 2 & 3
 Leon Fortalejo: Ang Simula Ng Wakas
 Magic Moment Book 2: I Have Kept You In My Heart
 The Bodyguards: Tennessee
 MONTE FALCO: Island In The Sun (Revised Edition)
 The Bodyguards: Jose Luis Morrison Monte Falco

Sweetheart Series
 Sweetheart 1
 Sweetheart 2: Lavender Lace
 Sweetheart 3: You Belong To My Heart
 Sweetheart 4: My Knight In Shining Armour
 Sweetheart 5: All My Love
 Sweetheart 6: Mrs. Winters
 Sweetheart 7: Somewhere Between Lovers and Friends
 Sweetheart 8: My Cheating Heart
 Sweetheart 9: Mananatili Kitang Mahal
 Sweetheart 10: How Did I Fall In Love With You?
 Sweetheart 11: My Own True Love
 Sweetheart 12: Charles' Angel
 Sweetheart 13: Someday My Prince
 Sweetheart 14: Sensual
 Sweetheart 15: A Kiss Remembered
 Sweetheart 16: My Wayward Wife
 Sweetheart 17: Someone To Watch Over Me
 Sweetheart 18: My Long-Time Friend, My One-Week Wife
 Sweetheart 19: She Wears My Ring

My Love, My Hero
 Dominic
 JSS
 Mitch 1 & 2
 Kiel 1 & 2
 Hanz
 Montañez 1 & 2

PHR Classics
 Midnight Phantom
 Impostor
 Sinner or Saint
 Iniibig Kita... Mahirap Bang Sabihin Iyon?
 Marry Me, Stranger

Gems
 Pangako
 Minsan... Dito Sa Puso Ko
 Hello Again, My Heart
 Sunset and You (Revised Version of Akin Ka Noon, Ngayon, at Kailanman)
 Mystic
 Arrivederci, Roma
 SAGADA: Nayakap Ko Ang Mga Ulap
 CORON: Iisa Lang Ang Puso Ko
 The Heiress and the farmer

Secrets
 Hello Again, Stranger
 Ikaw Ay Ako O Ako Ay Ikaw

My Lovely Bride
 Regina and Luke
 Mackenzie and James

Monte Falco
 Monte Falco: Island In The Sun 1
 Monte Falco: Island In The Sun 2

All-Time Favorite Collection
 Dugtungan Mo Ang Isang Magandang Alaala
 Akin Ka Noon, Ngayon, at Kailanman (Revised as Sunset and You)
 Nang Gabing Maging Akin Ka
 Roses Are Red, Violets Are Blue
 Aagawin Kita Sa Kanya
 With This Ring...
 Only You
 Be My Love, Catherine
 For The Love Of Alyssa
 Kung Kaya Mo Nang Sabihing Mahal Mo Ako
 Mga Latay Ng Pag-ibig
 Ikaw, Ikaw Ang Iniibig Ko
 Apoy Sa Malamig Na Puso
 Be Still, My Heart
 Leia, My Love
 Forbidden Love
 Ganoon Kita Kamahal
 You're Mine, Only Mine
 Beloved Enemy
 First Time I Saw You
 Sexy and Dangerous
 When Fools Rush In
 Mananatili Kang Akin
 Ang Lalaking Hindi Ko Pinangarap
 Love Trap
 I'm Crazy For You
 Almost A Fairy Tale
 El Paraiso
 The Substitute Bride (Revised Edition)

PHR Gothic Romance
 The Wolf and the Beauty
 It's Just A Fantasy

References

Sources
 http://www.filglobe.com/february2008/romancenovels.html
 http://www.pep.ph/guide/tv/6047/%3Cem%3EPrecious-Hearts-Romances%3C-em%3E-marks-TV-anniversary-with-%3Cem%3EImpostor%C2%A0-%3C-em%3E
 http://www.abs-cbn.com/Feature/Article/10306/ABS-CBN-bags-another-International-Emmy-nomination-for-Impostor-.aspx
 http://www.pep.ph/guide/tv/9364/impostor-receives-gold-medal-for-being-nominated-at-the-international-emmy-awards
 https://web.archive.org/web/20101206174910/http://www.abs-cbn.com/Weekdays/cast/article/7994/phrpresentsmidnightphantom/PHR-Presents-Midnight-Phantom.aspx
http://www.pep.ph/guide/tv/6401/%20Precious-Hearts-Romances-Presents-Midnight-Phantom%20-relates-story-of-love,-betrayal,-and-revenge

External links

1956 births
2014 deaths
Filipino women novelists
Filipino novelists
Tagalog-language writers
University of the East alumni
Women romantic fiction writers
People from Zamboanga del Norte